Roberson-Everett-Roebuck House is a historic home located at Robersonville, Martin County, North Carolina. It was built about 1900, and is a -story, Queen Anne style frame cottage.  It has a steeply pitched hipped roof with central tower, lower cross gables, front porch, and a double-pile center hall plan.  The house features decorative woodwork including exterior gable ornaments, bracketed cornices, and the front porch balustrade and spindle frieze.  Also on the property is a contributing combination wood and smokehouse.

It was added to the National Register of Historic Places in 2010.

References

Houses on the National Register of Historic Places in North Carolina
Queen Anne architecture in North Carolina
Houses completed in 1900
Houses in Martin County, North Carolina
National Register of Historic Places in Martin County, North Carolina
Central-passage houses
1900 establishments in North Carolina